William Paul Barretta (born June 19, 1964) is an American puppeteer, actor, producer, writer, and director, who is best known for providing the puppetry and voice of characters such as Pepe the King Prawn, Johnny Fiama, Big Mean Carl, and Bobo the Bear. He also inherited the roles of Rowlf the Dog, The Swedish Chef, Mahna Mahna, and Dr. Teeth after the death of Muppet creator Jim Henson.

Early life

Barretta was born William Paul Barretta in Yardley, Pennsylvania on June 19, 1964. He is the younger brother of children's book author and illustrator Gene Barretta. The brothers attended St. Mary's Hall-Doane Academy in Burlington, New Jersey. Bill eventually became a carpenter. He met Brian Henson while they were working at Sesame Place.

Career
Barretta has been performing with The Muppets since 1991, when he puppeteered the body of Sinclair family patriarch, Earl Sinclair on Dinosaurs. He later developed several new characters on Muppets Tonight, including Pepe the King Prawn, Johnny Fiama, Big Mean Carl, and Bobo the Bear.

Barretta has taken over several of Jim Henson's roles, such as Dr. Teeth, Rowlf the Dog, Mahna Mahna, and Swedish Chef, and briefly took over Jerry Nelson's role of Lew Zealand. His film debut as a principal puppeteer was in 1996's Muppet Treasure Island as Clueless Morgan.

Barretta has produced two of the Muppets' television films, It's a Very Merry Muppet Christmas Movie (2002) and The Muppets' Wizard of Oz (2005). Barretta also provided additional voices on Kim Possible. He performed in Muppets Most Wanted, where he also served as a co-producer. Barretta also served as an executive producer on the ABC series, The Muppets. In 2021, Barretta produced the special Muppets Haunted Mansion.

Filmography

Film

Television

Video games

Internet

Events

References

External links

MuppetZine Interview

Living people
People from Yardley, Pennsylvania
Muppet performers
Sesame Street Muppeteers
American male voice actors
American puppeteers
Doane Academy alumni
1964 births